Cairncross is a surname of Scottish origin, mostly found and is believed to originate in the east of Scotland. It is typically found in Angus, East Lothian, Fife, Perthshire, and in the Borders.

Notable people with the surname include:
 John Cairncross, a Soviet spy from Glasgow
 Cam Cairncross, Australian baseball player
 Frances Cairncross (born 1944), British economist, journalist and academic 
 Robert Cairncross, Scottish bishop of Edinburgh in the 16th century
 Alexander Cairncross (disambiguation), multiple people
 Alex Cairncross - Canadian Bass Guitarist of "...as the Poets affirm"
 Dr Sandy Cairncross, expert on tropical environmental health
 James Cairncross (1915-2009), star of Follow That Girl, and actor in Doctor Who etc.
 Jacob Cairncross, Heavy weight Brazilian jiu-jitsu champion and poker player.

References